The Blossac Park (French: Parc de Blossac) is a historic private garden, now a public park, in Poitiers, France. It was established by Paul Esprit Marie de La Bourdonnaye, Count of Blossac, in the 18th century. It is the largest park in Poitiers.

References

18th-century establishments in France
Gardens in Poitiers
Sculpture gardens, trails and parks in France